The 1999–00 Argentine Torneo Argentino A was the fifth season of third division professional football in Argentina. A total of 16 teams competed; the champion was promoted to Primera B Nacional.

Club information

Zone A

Zone B

First stage

Zone A

Results

Zone B

Results

Final stage

Results

Tiebreaker head-to-head

Relegation playoff

Huracán Corrientes remained in the Torneo Argentino A by winning the playoff and Estudiantes (RC) was relegated to 2000–01 Torneo Argentino B.

See also
1999–2000 in Argentine football

References

Torneo Argentino A seasons
3